Chain Lake is a census-designated place (CDP) in Snohomish County, Washington, United States. The population was 3,741 at the 2010 census.

Geography 
Chain Lake is located at  (47.903093, -121.987047).

According to the United States Census Bureau, the CDP has a total area of 10.60 square miles (27.46 km), of which, 10.55 square miles (27.33 km) of it is land and 0.05 square miles (0.13 km) of it (0.47%) is water.

References 

Census-designated places in Washington (state)
Census-designated places in Snohomish County, Washington